This is a list article of schools located in the Gisborne District of New Zealand.

School uniform is now fast becoming the norm at primary school and pre-school.  Before 2000, only intermediate and high school students had school uniform.

Kura Kaupapa Māori schools are schools for children aged 3–14 who learn fully in the Māori language. This starts at Kohanga Reo which is the Māori equivalent of kindergarten.

This list does not include proposed schools such as Waikirikiri High School. The area where it was supposed to be built is now a sports field and park, Waikirikiri Reserve.

The rolls given here are those provided by the Ministry of Education, based on figures from

References

Gisborne Region
List